Ursia is a genus of moths of the family Notodontidae, the prominents. The genus was erected by William Barnes and James Halliday McDunnough in 1911.

Species
Ursia furtiva Blanchard, 1971
Ursia noctuiformis Barnes & McDunnough, 1911

References

Further reading
Blanchard, A. (1971). "A new species in the genus Ursia (Barnes & McDunnough) (Lepidoptera: Notodontidae)". Proceedings of the Entomological Society of Washington. 73 (3): 303–305.

Notodontidae